The Institute for Condensed Matter Theory (ICMT) is an institute for the research of condensed matter theory hosted by and located at the University of Illinois at Urbana-Champaign.

ICMT was founded in 2007. The first director of the institute was Paul Goldbart who was followed by  Eduardo Fradkin. The chief scientist is Nobel laureate Anthony Leggett.

References

External links
 The Institute for Condensed Matter Theory

2007 establishments in Illinois
Physics institutes
Research institutes established in 2007
University of Illinois Urbana-Champaign centers and institutes
Theoretical physics institutes